James Cholmondeley (18 April 1708 – 13 October 1775) was a British Army officer and Member of Parliament between 1731 and 1747.

He fought at Fontenoy and during the 1745 Rising commanded a brigade at the Battle of Falkirk, where he suffered severe exposure. He retired from politics in 1747 and ceased his active military service in 1750, although promoted General in 1770.

His marriage ended in divorce in 1737 and he had no children; he died in 1775 and was buried in Westminster Abbey.

Life

James Cholmondeley was born in April 1708, third son of George, 2nd Earl of Cholmondeley (1666-1733) and Anna Elizabeth van Ruytenburgh (ca 1672–1722). His eldest brother, also named James, died young and George, Viscount Malpas (1703-1770) became heir; he had three sisters, Henrietta (1701-1769), Elizabeth (1705-1762) and Mary (1714-1783).

In 1726, he married Lady Penelope Barry (1708-1783), only child of the Earl of Barrymore and Elizabeth Savage. She was also heiress to Earl Rivers, who owned extensive estates near the Cholmondeley lands in Cheshire. The marriage was not successful and when they divorced in 1737, one of the conditions was neither would remarry; this meant that after Penelope died in 1783, the Rivers possessions passed into the Cholmondeley family.

He died childless in 1775 and his property was inherited by his nephew, George, later Marquess Cholmondeley.

Career

His father benefitted from backing William III in 1688 and George I in 1714, being rewarded with titles and offices, including command of the 3rd Troop of Horse Guards. In April 1725, James was commissioned into his father's troop, which was normally based in London, allowing its officers to combine a military career and political office.

His elder brother George married the daughter of Sir Robert Walpole, who was Whig Prime Minister from 1721 to 1742. He held a number of government positions, although his brother-in-law Horace Walpole (1717-1797) later described him as "a vain and empty man", promoted beyond his ability by his father-in-law.

This connection led to James becoming Member of Parliament for the government-controlled borough of Bossiney in 1731, then Camelford in the 1734 British general election. In 1739, commercial tensions with Spain resulted in the War of Jenkins' Ear; the military had been allowed to decay during the long period of peace since 1715 and early setbacks damaged Walpole's popularity. 

Cholmondeley was appointed colonel of the 48th Foot, a new regiment raised in January 1741 for the war. A few months later, he was returned as MP for Montgomery in the 1741 General Election but the government lost over 40 seats. While he continued to support the government, in February 1742 Walpole was removed from office and replaced by Earl Granville.

Britain now became involved in the War of the Austrian Succession and Cholmondeley transferred to the 34th Foot in December 1742. He campaigned in Flanders from 1743 to 1745, under the Duke of Cumberland and fought at Fontenoy in May 1745. While this was an Allied defeat, his unit was part of the rearguard action that enabled their forces to retreat in good order.

Promoted Brigadier-General in July, his regiment was among the reinforcements sent to Britain in November during the 1745 Rising and served in Scotland under Henry Hawley. In early January 1746, the Jacobites besieged Stirling Castle; on 13th, Hawley ordered 4,000 men under Cholmondeley and John Huske north to Falkirk to relieve it, following himself with another 3,000 men. The Battle of Falkirk began late in the afternoon of 17 January in failing light and was marked by confusion and command failures on both sides. A violent snow storm broke out as the regiments deployed, making co-ordination extremely difficult; the government left was routed but Cholmondeley's brigade on the right held their ground and prevented a major Jacobite success.

He fell seriously ill as a result of the extreme weather conditions and was not present with his regiment at Culloden in April. This ended his active military career, although he remained Colonel of the 6th Dragoons until his death. He was promoted general in 1770 but in the 18th century, this simply meant the holder was eligible for command; there were far more generals than positions available and many never held an active post.

He retired from Parliament in 1747 and little is known of his life after this, although Dutch author Isabelle de Charrière records meeting him during her visit to London in 1766. When his brother George died in 1770, he replaced him as Governor of Chester but normally resided at Carrington House, in Mayfair. He died on 13 October 1775 and was buried in Westminster Abbey, near his uncles Robert and Richard, who died in 1678 and 1680 while pupils at Westminster School.

References

Sources

External links
 
 
 

|-

1708 births
1775 deaths
Younger sons of earls
British MPs 1727–1734
British MPs 1734–1741
British MPs 1741–1747
British Army generals
British Life Guards officers
Carabiniers (6th Dragoon Guards) officers
34th Regiment of Foot officers
48th Regiment of Foot officers
British Army personnel of the War of the Austrian Succession
British Army personnel of the Jacobite rising of 1745
Burials at Westminster Abbey
Members of the Parliament of Great Britain for English constituencies
Members of the Parliament of Great Britain for Welsh constituencies
6th (Inniskilling) Dragoons officers
12th Royal Lancers officers